Henry Walton (1746–1813) was an English painter and art dealer.

Little is known of Walton's early life. In 1770, he began studying art at the St. Martin's Lane Academy, in London. Walton primarily worked as a portraitist, painting in oil and producing miniatures. Later he painted some genre works. Records show he later worked as a picture dealer and adviser to some major private collectors.

References

External links 

 A Girl Buying a Ballad  exhibited 1778 from Tate Collection
 
 

18th-century English painters
English male painters
19th-century English painters
English portrait painters
1746 births
1813 deaths
People from Dickleburgh
19th-century English male artists
18th-century English male artists